Voskresenskoye is a rural locality (a selo) in Penkinskoye Rural Settlement, Kameshkovsky District, Vladimir Oblast, Russia. The population was 13 as of 2010.

Geography 
Voskresenskoye is located 37 km south of Kameshkovo (the district's administrative centre) by road. Pirogovo is the nearest rural locality.

References 

Rural localities in Kameshkovsky District